Azzopardi may refer to:

People 

 Azzopardi, a family name originating in Italy and Malta

Biology 

 Azzopardi phenomenon

See also 

 Azopardi, a surname